Charles Arthur Winter (24 December 1903 – 4 March 1982) was an English cricketer who played 26 first-class matches for Somerset County Cricket Club between 1921 and 1925.  A right-handed batsman, he scored 437 first-class runs for the county from the middle-to-lower order.  He also bowled occasionally for Somerset as a right-arm fast-medium bowler, claiming 15 wickets a bowling average of 38.13.

Cricket career
Winter made his debut for Somerset in 1921, aged 18, in a County Championship match against Glamorgan.  Batting in the middle order, he was dismissed for one in his only innings of a drawn match.  He reached double figures for the first time in his fifth match, against Hampshire in 1922, scoring 15 in the first-innings and remaining 11 not out in the second.  He made his highest score in a University Match against Cambridge University in 1924, scoring an unbeaten 44.

Throughout his career, Winter generally batted in the middle-to-lower order, despite not being used as a front-line bowler.  His fifteen career first-class wickets were spread throughout his cricketing career, with his best return coming in a 1924 match against Yorkshire, when he took four wickets in twelve and a half overs.  Winter's best season with both bat and ball was the 1924, in which he claimed almost half of his wickets, and well over a third of his runs.  The season also saw him represent the Marylebone Cricket Club (MCC) in a one-day match against Indian Gymkhana.  During the match, held at Lord's, he scored six in a drawn match.

Winter's father, also named Charles Winter, had previously played for Somerset between 1882 and 1895 as a fast bowler.

Military career
On 6 May 1944, Winter was gazetted into the Royal Electrical and Mechanical Engineers as a second lieutenant.

References

1903 births
1982 deaths
English cricketers
Somerset cricketers
British Army personnel of World War II
Royal Electrical and Mechanical Engineers officers
Military personnel from Middlesex